Amselina olympi is a moth of the family Autostichidae. It is found in Asia Minor (the Anatolian mountains).

References

Moths described in 1957
Amselina
Insects of Turkey